Chlebowo may refer to the following places:
Chlebowo, Brodnica County in Kuyavian-Pomeranian Voivodeship (north-central Poland)
Chlebowo, Lipno County in Kuyavian-Pomeranian Voivodeship (north-central Poland)
Chlebowo, Masovian Voivodeship (east-central Poland)
Chlebowo, Konin County in Greater Poland Voivodeship (west-central Poland)
Chlebowo, Oborniki County in Greater Poland Voivodeship (west-central Poland)
Chlebowo, Września County in Greater Poland Voivodeship (west-central Poland)
Chlebowo, Pomeranian Voivodeship (north Poland)
Chlebowo, Lubusz Voivodeship (west Poland)
Chlebowo, Drawsko County in West Pomeranian Voivodeship (north-west Poland)
Chlebowo, Gryfino County in West Pomeranian Voivodeship (north-west Poland)
Chlebowo, Koszalin County in West Pomeranian Voivodeship (north-west Poland)
Chlebowo, Stargard County in West Pomeranian Voivodeship (north-west Poland)